The Old State House, formerly called the Arkansas State House, is the oldest surviving state capitol building west of the Mississippi River. It was the site of the secession convention, as well as the fourth constitutional convention when delegates agreed to ensure voting rights for freedmen and establish public education.

History

Construction

Commissioned by Governor John Pope, the State House was constructed between 1833 and 1842. Architect Gideon Shryock, who previously designed the Kentucky State Capitol in Frankfort, chose a Greek Revival style for the building. The original design was too expensive for the territory, so Shryock's assistant George Weigart changed the plans and oversaw construction. The Arkansas General Assembly moved into the building while construction was ongoing. On December 4, 1837, in the first session of the General Assembly, Speaker John Wilson killed Representative Joseph J. Anthony in a knife fight on the floor of the state House of Representatives.

American Civil War

Unionists prevailed at an initial, March 1861, secession convention after the 1860 election of Abraham Lincoln. However, after South Carolina fired on Fort Sumter and Lincoln called up troops, on the morning of May 6, 1861, a second secession convention assembled at the State House. After intense debate, an ordinance of secession passed with five opposing votes. Four opposing delegates relented after unanimity was urged. Isaac Murphy, a delegate from Madison County, held out despite enormous pressure. After the Union victory at the Battle of Bayou Fourche in September 1863, Federal troops occupied the building for the rest of the war.

Reconstruction Era
 

After the American Civil War ended, the State House was the site of another constitutional convention to determine whether Arkansas would accept the Fourteenth Amendment to the U.S. Constitution, permit suffrage for black males over 21, and create public schools for both black and white children. After contentious debate, the proposals were approved in a new constitution that emerged in February 1868, and was ratified in March. Also during Reconstruction, the State House was an object of contention in the so-called Brooks–Baxter War, and was fortified during that struggle. The cannon "Lady Baxter" still remains on the State House grounds. As part of the Arkansas exhibit for the 1876 Philadelphia Centennial Exposition, a three-tiered fountain sat in front of the States exhibit building. The following year in 1877 the fountain was placed on the state house grounds. A recast of the original fountain now sits in its place. In 1885, an iron statue of the three graces, representing Law, Justice and Mercy, was placed atop of the State House, however it was removed in 1928.

Changing use

The building served as a state capitol until the new capitol building was constructed in 1912. For a time it was used as a medical school. Afterwards, it served as an Arkansas war memorial and was used as an office building for federal and state agencies, as well as a meeting place for patriotic organizations. In 1947 the General Assembly approved acts designating the State House as a museum. The front entrance was the site of President Bill Clinton's presidential campaign announcement on October 3, 1991 and the site of his election night celebrations in both of his campaigns for the presidency on November 3, 1992 and November 5, 1996, respectively. The building underwent major renovation in 1996, and it was designated a National Historic Landmark in 1997. The building continues to serve as a museum with exhibits related to Arkansas history and culture. Permanent collections include battle flags, the inaugural gowns of the First Ladies of Arkansas, art pottery, and African-American quilts. Special exhibits are staged periodically as well.

Interior

Floor plans

See also
David O. Dodd Memorial
List of National Historic Landmarks in Arkansas
List of the oldest buildings in Arkansas
MacArthur Museum of Arkansas Military History
National Register of Historic Places listings in Little Rock, Arkansas

References

Further reading

External links

 
 

1833 establishments in Arkansas Territory
American Civil War on the National Register of Historic Places
Arkansas in the American Civil War
Brooks–Baxter War
Buildings and structures on the Arkansas River
Arkansas
Government buildings completed in 1842
Government buildings in Little Rock, Arkansas
Government buildings on the National Register of Historic Places in Arkansas
Greek Revival architecture in Little Rock, Arkansas
Historic American Buildings Survey in Arkansas
History museums in Arkansas
Institutions accredited by the American Alliance of Museums
Museums in Little Rock, Arkansas
National Historic Landmarks in Arkansas
National Register of Historic Places in Little Rock, Arkansas
Terminating vistas in the United States